Baptist Chapel, Great Warford is located in Merryman's Lane in the village of Great Warford, Cheshire, England.  It is recorded in the National Heritage List for England as a designated Grade II* listed building.

History

In 1712 a group of dissenters, who had been meeting in local farmhouses, acquired this building.  At that time it consisted of a contiguous barn and cottage.  The barn was converted into a meeting place for the worshippers.  The early trustees were prominent Baptists. In 1813 the building was divided into two, the west part becoming a cottage for the minister and the east end continuing as the chapel.

Architecture

Exterior

The building was originally timber-framed with wattle and daub infill.  In the 1813 rebuilding the south, east and west walls were replaced by brick and it is likely that the infill in the north wall was replaced by brick.  The north wall is still timber-framed with ten oak uprights and four horizontals at different levels. On its ground floor are three two-light casement windows and on the first floor two two-light casement windows which are placed irregularly.  The south front is in six bays.  The two-storey cottage on the left has to the west a splayed-head doorway.  To the right on the ground floor are two two-light windows and on the first floor one two-light window and a datestone inscribed "WBC 1813".  The chapel has two triangular-headed lancet windows with stone cills and a door similar to that of the cottage.  Between the windows is a plaque inscribed "Great Warford Baptist Chapel Founded at Norbury Houses 1642".  The east front has one triangular-headed lancet window.  On the west front is a blocked doorway and a two-light casement window on the first floor. The roof is original with Kerridge stone slabs.

Interior
The roof is supported by two central posts. At the east end is a gallery. All the furniture is original. The pulpit is in the middle of the dividing wall facing the gallery. The chapel contains five 19th-century box pews to the north and four to the south. In the centre of a pew on the north side is a coke stove. The chapel can seat 62 people. The registers begin in 1757.

Use for filming

The chapel was used as a filming location for a wedding scene in the TV series Cousin Phillis.

See also

Grade II* listed buildings in Cheshire East
Listed buildings in Great Warford

References

External links
Great Warford Baptist Chapel – by O. Knott.

Chapels in England
Baptist churches in Cheshire
Grade II* listed churches in Cheshire
Churches completed in 1712
18th-century Baptist churches in the United Kingdom
Churches completed in 1813